Je Jong-geel (born March 21, 1955) is a South Korean politician. He was a member of the 17th National Assembly and the mayor of Ansan from 2014 to 2018. He is a member of the Chirwon Je clan.

References 

1955 births
Living people
People from Changwon
Chirwon Je clan